Lalana is a village in Nohar, Hanumangarh, Rajasthan, India. Lalana is a large village so it is divided into five sub-villages or bas. These five bas are Uttrada, Dhikhanada, Shyopura, Nathwaniya, and Jaitasari.

The population of Lalana is approximately 9,500.

Villages in Hanumangarh district